Pundi is a Major village in Srikakulam district of the Indian state of Andhra Pradesh. It is located in Vajrapukotturu mandal .

Transportation
Pundi railway station is 12 km distance from Palasa railway station.

References

Villages in Srikakulam district